Wembley 1996 Live is a live concert video from the Canadian rocker Bryan Adams. It was his first concert video and was shot at Wembley Stadium on 27 July 1996, performing to a sold-out over 70,000 people, is released by Eagle Rock Entertainment on October 14, 2016.

The video album peaked at number one in its category in the UK.

Track listing
"The Only Thing That Looks Good on Me Is You" (Adams, Lange)
"Do to You" (Adams, Lange)
"Kids Wanna Rock" (Adams, Vallance)
"Can't Stop This Thing We Started" (Adams, Lange)
"This Time" (Adams, Vallance)
"18 til I Die (Adams, Lange)
"Have You Ever Really Loved a Woman?" 	(Adams, Lange, Kamen)
"Touch the Hand" (Adams, Lange)
"Cuts Like a Knife" (Adams, Vallance) 
"It's Only Love (duet with Melissa Etheridge)  (Adams, Vallance)
"Somebody" (Adams, Vallance)
"(Everything I Do) I Do It for You" (Adams, Lange, Kamen)
"Run to You" (Adams, Vallance)
"There Will Never Be Another Tonight" (Adams, Lange, Vallance)
"Seven Nights to Rock" (Henry Glover, Louis Innis, Buck Trail) 
"(I Wanna Be) Your Underwear" (Adams, Lange)
"Wild Thing" (Chip Taylor)
"It Ain't a Party... If You Can't Come 'Round" (Adams, Lange)
"She's Only Happy When She's Dancin" (Adams, Vallance)
"Summer of '69" (Adams, Vallance)
"All for Love (Adams, Lange, Kamen)
"Let's Make a Night to Remember" (Adams, Lange)
"I Fought the Law" (Sonny Curtis)
"Heaven" (Adams, Vallance)

Charts

Bryan Adams: Wembley 1996 Live

A fully restored film edition of the Wembley Stadium performance was released in 2016, with CD and vinyl editions.

Track listing CD Album

Disc one 
"The Only Thing That Looks Good on Me Is You"
"Do to You"
"Kids Wanna Rock"
"Can't Stop This Thing We Started"
"This Time"
"18 til I Die
"Have You Ever Really Loved a Woman?"
"Touch the Hand"
"Cuts Like a Knife"
"It's Only Love (feat. Melissa Etheridge)
"Somebody"
"(Everything I Do) I Do It for You"

Disc two 
"Run to You"
"There Will Never Be Another Tonight"
"Seven Nights to Rock" 
"(I Wanna Be) Your Underwear"
"Wild Thing" 
"It Ain't a Party... If You Can't Come 'Round"
"She's Only Happy When She's Dancin"
"Summer of '69"
"All for Love"
"Let's Make a Night to Remember"
"I Fought the Law"
"Heaven"

Track listing Triple Vinyl Album

Disc A 
"The Only Thing That Looks Good on Me Is You"
"Do to You"
"Kids Wanna Rock"
"Can't Stop This Thing We Started"
"This Time"
"18 til I Die
"Have You Ever Really Loved a Woman?"
"Touch the Hand"
"Cuts Like a Knife"

Disc B 
"It's Only Love (feat. Melissa Etheridge)
"Somebody"
"(Everything I Do) I Do It for You"
"Run to You"
"There Will Never Be Another Tonight"
"Seven Nights to Rock" 
"(I Wanna Be) Your Underwear"
"Wild Thing" 
"It Ain't a Party... If You Can't Come 'Round"

Disc C 
"She's Only Happy When She's Dancin"
"Summer of '69"
"All for Love"
"Let's Make a Night to Remember"
"I Fought the Law"
"Heaven"

Personnel 
Bryan Adams — vocals, guitars, harmonica, directed, photography 
Keith Scott — guitars, backing vocals
Mickey Curry — drums, backing vocals
Tommy Mandel — keyboards, piano, backing vocals
Dave Taylor — bass guitars, backing vocals
Danny Cummings — percussion, backing vocals

Special guests 
Melissa Etheridge — vocals in "It's Only Love"

External staff 
Bob Clearmountain — engineer, mixed
Geoff Kempin — executive-producer
Terry Shand — executive-producer 
Bruce Allen — producer, product manager 
Büro Dirk Rodolph — artwork
Andrew Catlin — photography

References

Bryan Adams
2016 video albums
2016 live albums
Live video albums
Live albums recorded at Wembley Stadium